Kelvin was a historic home located at Pittsboro, Chatham County, North Carolina.  It was built about 1831, was a two-story, five bay Federal style single pile frame dwelling. The house had a gable roof and exterior end chimneys. It had a one-story addition built about 1838.  It originally housed a private girls school established by wealthy landowner Colonel Edward Jones Kelvin.  It has been demolished.

It was listed on the National Register of Historic Places in 1982.

References

Houses on the National Register of Historic Places in North Carolina
Federal architecture in North Carolina
Houses completed in 1831
Houses in Chatham County, North Carolina
National Register of Historic Places in Chatham County, North Carolina
Pittsboro, North Carolina